The 16th National Hockey League All-Star Game took place at Maple Leaf Gardens on October 6, 1962. The hometown Toronto Maple Leafs defeated the NHL all-stars 4–1.

The game

Eddie Shack was named the first ever all-star game MVP, as the Toronto Maple Leafs erupted for four goals in the opening period against all-star goaltender Jacques Plante of the Montreal Canadiens. It was the first victory for the Maple Leafs in the annual classic, after falling to the All-Stars in 1947, 1948 and 1949.

Shack scored Toronto's fourth goal. Dick Duff, Bob Pulford and Frank Mahovlich also scored for the Leafs, while Gordie Howe, appearing in his record 14th all-star game, beat Johnny Bower.

In the days leading up to the game, the NHL was worried because Toronto had only two players under contract—rookie Kent Douglas and captain George Armstrong; however, last minute efforts led to all players signing contracts in time to appear in the game.

Game summary

Referee: Eddie Powers
Linesmen: Matt Pavelich and Ron Wicks
Attendance: 14,236

References

National Hockey League All-Star Games
All-Star Game
1962
Ice hockey competitions in Toronto
National Hockey League All-Star Game
National Hockey League All-Star Game